Yellowhead disease (YHD) is a viral infection of shrimp and prawn, in particular of the giant tiger prawn (Penaeus monodon), one of the two major species of farmed shrimp. The disease is caused by the Yellow head virus genotype 1 (YHV1), a positive-strand RNA virus related to coronaviruses and arteriviruses. 

The disease is highly lethal and contagious, killing shrimp quickly. Outbreaks of this disease have wiped out in a matter of days the entire populations of many shrimp farms that cultivated P. monodon, i.e. particularly Southeast Asian farms. In Thai, the disease is called . A closely related virus is the Gill-associated virus (GAV).

Clinical
The cephalothorax of infected shrimp turns yellow after a period of unusually high feeding activity ending abruptly, and the then moribund shrimps congregate near the surface of their pond before dying. YHD leads to death of the animals within two to four days.

History
YHD had been reported first from Thailand in 1990, the closely related GAV has been discovered in 1995 during a yellowhead-like disease in Australian shrimp farms.

References

External links

 ICTV Report: Roniviridae

Penaeidae
Fisheries science
Animal viral diseases
Diseases and parasites of crustaceans
Roniviridae